Terra-Man (real name Toby Manning) is a supervillain who appears in Superman stories published by DC Comics.

Publication history
Terra-Man first appeared in Superman #249 (March 1972) and was created by Cary Bates, Curt Swan, and Dick Dillin. Bates says that the character was inspired by Clint Eastwood's Man with No Name, who appeared in a trio of Spaghetti Western films from 1964 to 1966.

Fictional character biography

Pre-Crisis

The Pre-Crisis Terra-Man was noted for using futuristic weapons modeled after those used in the Old West as well as riding an Arguvian space steed (a type of alien winged horse) named Nova.

As revealed in Superman #249, Tobias "Toby" Manning was born during the Old West era. An alien known as the Currency-Criminal accidentally killed Toby's father Jess and took young Toby as his ward, raising him from childhood and teaching him the use of alien weapons, which were created to resemble the 19th century weapons with which Toby was familiar. After Manning had grown to adulthood and learned what he could, he killed the alien and began a career as an interstellar outlaw called "Terra-Man", a name chosen to refer to Manning's Earthly origins. For transportation, he tamed the Arguvian space steed named Nova. Eventually his travels took him to Earth, where he became an enemy of Superman. Throughout his Pre-Crisis career, Terra-Man periodically returned to Earth in attempts to outfight or outwit Superman; otherwise, he remained at large in outer space, committing crimes to carry the legend of the Wild West outlaw across the stars. Terra-Man spoke in an exaggerated "cowboy" drawl with liberal use of Old West slang and colloquialisms, lending a humorous air to his deadly activities.

Following a fight with Superman, Terra-Man enlisted his counterpart from Earth-377, a world where the inhabitants can perform magic, to help him fight Superman.

This version of Terra-Man is revealed to be dead by the time of Whatever Happened To The Man Of Tomorrow. Lois Lane mentioned that Terra-Man and the Parasite (a frequent partner in crime) had ended up killing each other at some point before the start of the story.

Post-Crisis
The Post-Crisis version of Terra-Man was a businessman whose conscience began to bother him about the damage he was causing to the Earth's environment. Toby Manning decided to save Earth and began attacking enterprises which were dangerous to the environment. Although this version has a different origin, his name (Tobias Manning) remained the same and he still retained a western theme, including a thick accent and the cowboy-esque way that he handled his guns. His weapons, however, were now focused primarily on turning the environment against his opponents (i.e., plants and the Earth element). Terra-Man also had a robotic army dressed in western garb, called the "Terra-Men".

Like his modus operandi, Manning's new background was ecologically based. The weapons and equipment he developed enabled him to use a pair of jet packs mounted on his armor for flight, create a teleportation vortex resembling a small tornado and wield guns that can cause shockwaves and earthquakes or spout specially-tailored flora at a target. He engineered numerous forms of plant life to meet his needs, including one that can actively drain other lifeforms of energy derived from sunlight, allowing it to drain power from Superman when in contact with him. Another form of plant life he created could liquify organic material. He also developed a process to quickly and cleanly remove all dangerous poisons from toxic sites and renew nutrients in soil.

At times, Manning respected Superman's common desire to preserve nature. At other times, Terra-Man feared that Superman was contaminating the Earth with extraterrestrial germs and viruses and tried to end the Man of Steel's life before any more "harm" could be done to the environment. In addition to battling Superman, Terra-Man assisted the Metropolis Special Crimes Unit, as seen in that miniseries.

In Infinite Crisis, Terra-Man became a member of the Secret Society of Super Villains.

15 days after the end of Infinite Crisis during 52, Terra-Man hijacked Ferris Air Flight 456 over the Mediterranean Sea and Power Girl gave chase. Terra-Man escaped capture thanks to Black Adam, who forbade Power Girl from entering Khandaq airspace. Later, Terra-Man appeared to ally himself with Black Adam. However, when Black Adam later addressed the media in front of Khandaq's embassy in New York City, he suddenly ripped Terra-Man in half, killing him.

During the Blackest Night storyline, Terra-Man was identified as one of the deceased entombed below the Hall of Justice.

Powers and abilities
The Pre-Crisis version of Terra-Man has an altered physiology that slows down his aging process, and allows him to survive unprotected in space. He wields a special six-shooter that can fire tracer bullets, energy-leeching tumbleweeds, and laser lassos. Terra-Man uses an Arguvian space steed named Nova as his mode of transportation.

The Post-Crisis version of Terra-Man uses weapons that focused mainly on turning the environment against his opponents (i.e., plants and the Earth element).

In other media
 Tobias Manning appears in the Justice League Unlimited episode "The Once and Future Thing Part One: Weird Western Tales", voiced by Ed O'Ross. This version is an outlaw from the 1880s. After stealing Chronos' future technology and running Sheriff Ohiyesa Smith out of Elkhorn, Manning takes over the town until Smith joins forces with Bat Lash, Jonah Hex, El Diablo, and a time-traveling Batman, Wonder Woman, and Green Lantern to defeat Manning and take back Elkhorn.
 Terra-Man appears in the Legion of Super Heroes episode "Unnatural Alliances", voiced by Jeff Black. This version is a powerful android capable of self-repairing who hails from the 41st century. He was created and sent back in time by a sentient artificial intelligence called K3NT to kill a boy named Abel before he can grow up and invent technology that would later give rise to Imperiex, who reluctantly joins forces with K3NT's other creation Kel-El / Superman X to protect Abel and destroy Terra-Man to ensure their existences for their own reasons.

References

External links
 Terra-Man (Earth-One) at DC Comics Wiki
 Terra-Man (New Earth) at DC Comics Wiki
 Terra-Man at Comic Vine

Characters created by Cary Bates
Characters created by Dick Dillin
Characters created by Curt Swan
Comics characters introduced in 1972
DC Comics supervillains
DC Comics male supervillains
DC Comics Western (genre) characters
DC Comics orphans
Superheroes who are adopted
Superman characters
Fictional businesspeople
Fictional conservationists and environmentalists